Louis Jacques Botes (born 28 November 1980 in Johannesburg, South Africa) is a former professional rugby union player. He usually played as a flanker or a number eight.

In 2014, he broke Helgard Müller's Currie Cup appearance record, eventually going on to play in 156 Currie Cup matches.

Career

Pumas

He became a regular for the Pumas, making 42 appearances for them in the 2003 Vodacom Shield, 2003 Currie Cup, 2004 Vodacom Shield and 2004 Currie Cup competitions.

Sharks

Botes made the move to Durban to join the  prior to the 2005 Super 12 season.

During the 2013 Currie Cup Premier Division, he broke the record for the most number of Currie Cup appearances when he played in his 143rd match against .

He increased this record to 156 before his retirement at the end of the 2014 season.

Barbarians

His final ever appearances was for the Barbarians against the Leicester Tigers on 4 November 2014 in a match celebrating Barbarians' 125th anniversary. He scored the final try in a 59–26 victory and also slotted the resultant conversion.

External links
 Sharks profile
 
 itsrugby.co.uk profile

References

1980 births
Living people
Rugby union players from Johannesburg
South African rugby union players
Sharks (rugby union) players
Sharks (Currie Cup) players
Pumas (Currie Cup) players
Rugby union flankers
Afrikaner people
University of Pretoria alumni
Alumni of Maritzburg College